Gagarinskaya metro station may refer to:
Gagarinskaya (Novosibirsk Metro), a station of the Novosibirsk Metro, Novosibirsk, Russia
Gagarinskaya (Samara Metro), a station of the Samara Metro, Samara, Russia

See also
 Gagarinsky (disambiguation)